Food in UK hospitals has been the subject of attention from celebrity chefs. James Martin was tasked with revamping the menu and catering facilities at Scarborough General Hospital in September 2011, for Operation Hospital Food for the BBC.  The show was recommissioned for a second and third series  which were shown on BBC One in 2013 and 2014 respectively.  Prue Leith is patron of Sustain's Campaign for Better Hospital Food and backed a new review of hospital food standards by Matt Hancock in August 2019.

Standards
In 2013 the Academy of Medical Royal Colleges called for food-based standards to be mandatory in all UK hospitals as part of their campaign against obesity.

In 2016 NHS England rolled out national targets to reduce junk food and improve the availability of healthier options in English hospitals.  According to Sustain in 2019 "the lack of teeth to uphold food standards to date has meant hospitals have been free to ignore them."

In 2020 the Care Quality Commission turned their attention to hospital food standards after  seven patient deaths from listeria linked to pre-packaged sandwiches and salads in 2019, saying "Nutrition and hydration is part of a patient’s recovery."

Budgets
Sidney & Lois Eskenazi Hospital in Indianapolis has been recognized for its emphasis on growing and serving local and healthy food options. In 2016, the Physicians Committee for Responsible Medicine ranked Eskenazi sixth of 24 hospitals recognized across the US for providing fresh vegetables, whole grains, cholesterol-free entrees, and soy milk. The hospital produces about two tons of produce annually from its  rooftop gardens, called the Sky Farm. Of the $3.4 million annual food budget, the hospital allocates 40% to Indiana farm and food suppliers, serving about 113,000 meals monthly. 

In September 2018 as the Eswatini government had not paid suppliers Mbabane Government Hospital  ran out of food for patients.

Culture
Ayurveda hospitals provide vegetarian food cooked according to Ayurveda principles. Commercial hospitals may provide room service for their patients' convenience so patients are able to order food of their choice from a menu at a time that is suitable for them. Hospital staff may need to assist patients to ensure that they comply with their dietary restrictions. Visiting guests may order from the room service for a fee.

Chesterfield Royal Hospital NHS Foundation Trust  developed a scheme where vulnerable patients could order cost-price 'Home From Hospital' food packs through the discharge lounge which was featured by the BBC in "Operation Hospital Food". "The type of patient that might use these packs doesn't normally have a big appetite - they just need something simple, which is why I suggested the basics - such as bread, cheese, milk and butter. That way they can make themselves a cheese sandwich, cheese on toast, bread and butter, something very easy to have with a cup of tea. The hope is that it will reduce the risk of a patient not eating and drinking properly, one of the potential reasons for early re-admission to hospital. It's not rocket science, but as far as we know, it's not been done anywhere else in the NHS."

History
Horse meat was considered as a hospital food in 1946, even when it was not commonly eaten elsewhere.

References

Food 
Foods by type